Polauchenia protentor is a species of thread-legged bug (Emesinae), recorded from Panama and a Colombian tropical dry forest on the Caribbean coast.

References

Reduviidae
Insects described in 1925
Insects of Central America